Andelst is a village in the Dutch province of Gelderland. It is located in the municipality Overbetuwe, about 10 km northwest of the city of Nijmegen.

History 
It is an old village; the first known mention dates from 855, as Andassale, and means "hall of Ando (person)". The village developed on a high ridge and has been inhabited since the Roman period. The church has a tower from around 1400 and has been extensively restored between 1928 and 1930. In 1327, the Duke of Gelre established a legal court in Andelst. There used to be a little castle near Andelst, but it was demolished in 1846. In 1840, Andelst was home to 508 people.

Gallery

Reference 

Populated places in Gelderland
Overbetuwe